Adrian Hasler (born 11 February 1964) is a Liechtensteiner politician and trained economist who served as Prime Minister of Liechtenstein from 2013 to 2021.

Early life, family and education
Born to Arthur and Liselotte Hasler, Adrian Hasler was raised in Vaduz, one of three sons. He earned his Matura, the general qualification for university entrance, in 1984 at the Liechtenstein secondary school in Vaduz. Subsequently, he started studying business administration with an area of expertise in finance and accounting at the University of St. Gallen, where he graduated in 1991.

Early career 
Hasler worked as head of controlling in the business division Thin Films of Balzers AG. From 1996 until 2004, he was head of Group Finance and deputy-director of the Verwaltungs- und Privat-Bank in Vaduz.

Political career 
He was elected in 2001 as a Member of Parliament for the Progressive Citizens' Party (FBP). In March 2004, he resigned to become the new chief of the Liechtenstein National Police. On 1 April 2004 he therefore replaced the interim police chief Martin Meyer. Marco Ospelt succeeded him as a Member of Parliament. In 2012, he was selected as the FBP candidate for Prime Minister for the parliamentary elections in 2013. The party won the election.

Hasler became nation's 13th Prime Minister on 27 March 2013. As Prime Minister he was not only head of government of Liechtenstein, but also Minister for General Government Affairs and Finance. On 25 March 2021, Daniel Risch took over office as the nation's next prime minister.

Personal life 
Hasler married on 28 May 2003 to Gudrun Elkuch (born 5 September 1973), a member of the Krisens Intervention Team Liechtenstein. They have two sons, Pascal and Luis.

See also 
 Politics of Liechtenstein

References

External links 
 Adrian Hasler at the official website of the government of Liechtenstein

1964 births
Heads of government of Liechtenstein
Living people
Progressive Citizens' Party politicians
University of St. Gallen alumni
Government ministers of Liechtenstein
Members of the Landtag of Liechtenstein
People from Vaduz
Finance ministers of Liechtenstein